The 2001 Cape Verdean Football Championship season was the 22nd of the competition of the first-tier football in Cape Verde. The competition started on 7 April and finished on 6 June, 2001. The tournament was organized by the Cape Verdean Football Federation. Onze Unidos won their first and only title. No club participated in the 2001 CAF Champions League and the 2001 CAF Winners Cup.

Overview 
FC Derby was the defending team of the title. A total of 7 clubs. It was one of the few seasons that the total number of points would be the champion, it had fewer games compared to other football leagues. No club came from Boa Vista and Santiago islands as the championship were cancelled.

The league was contested by 7 teams with Onze Unidos winning the championship. 21 matches were played and a total of 55 goals were scored.

Onze Unidos finished with 14 points which became the highest number of points in the national championships with the extension of the matches from five to eight overall. The point record lasted only a year when Sporting and Batuque took the record in the following season.

Participants 

 Nô Pintcha, winner of the Brava Island League
 Botafogo FC, winner of the Fogo Island League
 Onze Unidos, winner of the Maio Island League
 Académica do Sal, winner of the Sal Island League
 Solpontense Futebol Clube, winner of the Santo Antão Island League
 FC Ultramarina, winner of the São Nicolau Island League
 FC Derby, winner of the São Vicente Island League

Information about the clubs

League standings

Results

Statistics 
 Top scorer: Di: 9 goals (of Sporting Praia)
 Highest scoring match: Botafogo 8-0 Nô Pintcha, 5 May

Notes

References

External links 
 https://web.archive.org/web/20150924011016/http://www.fcf.cv/pt/
 Complete results and rankings at rsssf.com

Cape Verdean Football Championship seasons
1
Cape